Sylencer is an American thrash metal group from Chicago, Illinois, formed in 2006 by Markus Johansson (vocals, guitar) and Johnny Rox (bass guitar). During recording of their debut album, A Lethal Dose of Truth, the band recruited drummer Kevin Talley on a session basis, although he became a full-time member in 2012.

History
In the summer of 2004, Markus Johansson sent a message to Johnny Rox via the Megadeth message boards, to see if he would like to get together and jam. After working together in various projects for the next two years, the pair set out to record what would ultimately become the Sylencer debut album. By May 2006, the tracking of their debut album began, with Sylencer recruiting drummer Kevin Talley, and lead guitarist Larry Tarnowski to round out the recording lineup. As the majority of the album was recorded by years end, hard economic times started to befall the band. But refusing to give up on the album, Markus and Johnny used their downtime to slowly but surely recruit more guests to the album's lineup, which grew to include members of Dream Theater, Anthrax, Dethklok, and nearly a dozen others.

As years passed and things for Sylencer started to rebound, they found themselves in a position to finally complete their debut accompanied by session members Talley (now a full member) and Larry Tarnowski, the album soon turned into a full collaborative effort with a large number of established heavy metal musicians contributing to the effort, including Dethklok's Gene Hoglan and Brendon Small, The Heathen (of Zimmers Hole, with Hoglan), Rob Caggiano (Anthrax, The Damned Things) and Jordan Rudess (Dream Theater), amongst others.

In December 2011, the band landed a licensing and distribution deal with dPulse Recordings/Ovrtone Music Group, Inc. in association with Sony Music Entertainment Germany. This led to the album's finally
receiving a release date, September 4, 2012, some six years since the project's start. 2012 also saw the addition of drummer Kevin Talley as a permanent member of the band, as well as the founding of the band's label, Sylencer Records, Inc., which is handling the album's release in tandem with dPulse Recordings, and Sony Music Entertainment Germany. Upon the release of their debut
album, "A Lethal Dose Of Truth," the band intends to take to road and tour just as relentlessly as they pursued their album's completion. On April 17, 2013 the band announced that a number of guest appearances for their sophomore album have been confirmed, including current and former members of Chimaira, Jag Panzer, King Diamond, Death, Forbidden, Korn and Megadeth.

Members
Full Lineup
Markus Johansson - vocals, guitars
Johnny Rox - bass guitar
Kevin Talley - drums, percussion
Session members
Larry Tarnowski - Lead Guitar
Guests on A Lethal Dose of Truth
Gene Hoglan - Drums
Brendan Small - Lead Guitar
Andy LaRocque - Lead Guitar
Michael Angelo Batio - Lead Guitar
Roland Grapow - Lead Guitar
The Heathen - Lead Vocals
Emil Werstler - Lead Guitar
Rob Caggiano - Lead Guitar
Metal Mike Chlasciak - Lead Guitar
Steve DiGiorgio - Bass Guitar
Sean Reinert - Drums
Jordan Rudess - Keyboards
Steve Smyth - Lead Guitar
Christian Lasegue - Lead Guitar
Marco Minnemann - Drums

Discography

A Lethal Dose of Truth (2012)

References

External links
Official Website

Musical groups from Chicago
Heavy metal musical groups from Illinois
Musical groups established in 2006